Alexander Fyodorovich Andreev (10 December 1939 – 14 March 2023) was a Russian theoretical physicist best known for explaining the eponymous Andreev reflection. Andreev was educated at the Moscow Institute of Physics and Technology, starting in 1959 and graduating ahead of schedule in 1961, having been mentored by Landau.

From 1979, Andreev was a professor at the Moscow Institute of Physics and Technology. He focused on the physics of superconductivity, quantum liquids and solids, surface phenomena, and magnetism.

Andreev was a vice-President of the Russian Academy of Sciences (1991–2013).

Prizes
1981 - Corresponding Member of USSR Academy of Sciences
1984 - Lomonosov Prize of Moscow State University
1986 - Lenin Prize (USSR)
1987 - Full member of USSR Academy of Sciences
1987 - Carus-Medal of German National Academy of Sciences Leopoldina and Carus-Prize of Stadt Schweinfurt
1992 - Lorentz Professorship, Leiden University (the Netherlands)
1995 - Simon Memorial Prize, Institute of Physics (U.K.)
1996 - Honorary member of Ioffe Institute, Russian Academy of Sciences
1999 - Kapitza Gold Medal, Russian Academy of Sciences
2001-2002 - Jubilee Professor, Chalmers University of Technology (Sweden)
2002 - Foreign member of Finnish Academy of Science and Letters
2002 - Foreign member of Georgian Academy of Sciences
2003 - Independent Prize "Triumph" (Russia)
2004 - Pomeranchuk Prize 
2004 - Doctorate honoris causa of Leiden University (the Netherlands)
2004 - Doctorate honoris causa of Kazan State University (Russia)
2005 - Honorary professor of Kyrgyz National University
2005 - Foreign member of Polish Academy of Sciences
2006 - John Bardeen International Prize
2008 - Foreign member of National Academy of Sciences of Ukraine
2011 - Demidov Prize of the Russian Academy of Sciences

References

1939 births
2023 deaths
Soviet physicists
Russian physicists
Full Members of the USSR Academy of Sciences
Full Members of the Russian Academy of Sciences
Members of the Finnish Academy of Science and Letters
Members of the Georgian National Academy of Sciences
Members of the Polish Academy of Sciences
Academic staff of the Moscow Institute of Physics and Technology
Demidov Prize laureates
Lenin Prize winners
Recipients of the Order "For Merit to the Fatherland", 3rd class
Recipients of the Order "For Merit to the Fatherland", 4th class
Moscow Institute of Physics and Technology alumni
Scientists from Saint Petersburg